Thomas Pearce Johns (September 7, 1851 – April 13, 1927) was a National Association outfielder. Johns played for the Baltimore Marylands in the 1873 season. He only played in one game in his one-year career, having no hits in four at-bats.

Johns was born and died in Baltimore. His brother, Richard Johns, umpired one National Association game in 1873.

External links

 Tommy Johns Memorial at Find A Grave

Baltimore Marylands players
1851 births
1927 deaths
Baseball players from Baltimore
19th-century baseball players